Eskibel (official Basque name) is a village in Álava, Basque Country, Spain. It forms part of the Southwest Rural Zone of Vitoria. It is situated 7.5 km southwest of the city in a small valley surrounded by the Mountains of Vitoria.

Always sparsely populated, in the early 19th century it had only 22 people, in 1960 it had 10, and today has only 2 (2001 census). The village comprises a few small buildings and the ruins of the Church of San Lorenzo (St Lawrence). A romanesque statue, known as the Virgin of Eskibel, was salvaged from the church ruins and can now be seen at the Diocesan Museum of Sacred Art in Vitoria.

Eskibel was the site of fighting in the Spanish War of Independence in the early 19th century and later during the Second Carlist War, when it was held by the Carlists of Vitoria.

The "Castillo de Gomecha" at Eskibel is the remains of an old fortified watch tower.

External links

Populated places in Álava